Benjamin Matthew Garrity (born 21 February 1997) is an English professional footballer who plays for  club Port Vale.

He began his career playing non-League football at Merseyside-based clubs NSC Junior, Oyster Martyrs, Formby and Lower Breck, winning Lower Breck's Player of the Season award in 2016–17. He joined Northern Premier League Premier Division side Warrington Town in 2018 and impressed enough to win a move to Blackpool in January 2020, turning professional in the English Football League shortly before the age of 23. He spent the 2020–21 season on loan at Oldham Athletic and was sold on to Port Vale in June 2021. He helped the club to win promotion out of League Two via the play-offs in 2022 and was also named as the club's Player of the Year.

Career

Early career
Garrity spent his early career with NSC Junior, playing for the club in the Walton & Kirkdale Junior Football league from 2004 to 2013. He then moved on to Oyster Martyrs, a Sunday league team in Liverpool. In October 2013, Garrity began a short spell at North West Counties Football League side Formby. Despite only making seven appearances, he played in four different competitions; league, Liverpool Senior Cup, NWCFL League Challenge Cup, and the NWCFL First Division Trophy. He then moved to Lower Breck in the Liverpool County Premier League. He made 29 appearances for Lower Breck in the 2016–17 season, scoring eight goals and making eight assists, and was named as the club's Player of the Season. He scored seven goals and made five assists from 28 appearances in the 2017–18 campaign.

Warrington Town
Garrity was signed by Warrington Town in 2018. He signed a new two-year deal with the club in June 2019 despite attracting interest from higher level clubs and was described as "irreplaceable" by manager Paul Carden. He spent 18 months with Warrington in the Northern Premier League Premier Division, scoring 17 goals in 54 league and cup games for the club, including two goals in their 'super play-off' defeat to King's Lynn Town at the end of the 2018–19 season. He missed just two league games during his time at Cantilever Park and was the club's top-scorer mid-way through the 2019–20 campaign. Upon leaving the club he said that he loved his time at Warrington and was disappointed not to have helped them achieve promotion. He became the first Warrington player to move directly into the English Football League in more than 20 years.

Blackpool
Garrity turned professional with Blackpool on 31 January 2020, signing an 18-month contract, after Blackpool paid an undisclosed fee reported to be in the region of £25,000. The transfer saw him move up four divisions to join the League One side. Manager Simon Grayson said the club had tracked Garrity for several months. He scored on his debut for the club, in a friendly game against Crewe Alexandra.

He was allowed to leave Bloomfield Road on loan after telling manager Neil Critchley he was desperate to play first-team games. On 2 September 2020, Garrity moved on loan to Oldham Athletic for the 2020–21 season after spending two weeks on trial at Boundary Park. He made his debut for the club three days later in the EFL Cup, opening the scoring in a 3–0 victory over Carlisle United, heading home a Bobby Grant free-kick. On 17 October, he scored his first League Two goal in a 2–1 win away at Bolton Wanderers. He added further goals against Hampton & Richmond Borough in the FA Cup and Barrow in the league, leading him to be described as a "lucky charm" for the club by the Warrington Guardian's Matt Turner. By January he was one of seven loan signings made by manager Harry Kewell, which left him at a disadvantage as EFL rules meant only five loanees could be named in matchday squads and four of the loanees were seen as key players. He also missed two months of the season due to injury, but was praised by new manager Keith Curle for his work-rate upon his return to action in early April. Garrity ended his loan spell with the "Latics" with four goals in 38 appearances across all competitions.

Though Garrity never made a competitive appearance for Blackpool, the club took an option to extend his contract shortly before his sale to Port Vale.

Port Vale

On 4 June 2021, it was announced that Garrity would join League Two side Port Vale for an undisclosed fee. Manager Darrell Clarke described him as a "young, hungry and ambitious footballer with great energy and fitness levels". He scored his first goals for the "Valiants" on 11 September, his brace securing a 2–1 victory away at Swindon Town; Clarke praised Garrity for his serious professionalism after the match, pointing out that "he has tests to make sure he is getting the right food into his system". He went on to score the only goal of the game against Scunthorpe United and was nominated for September's Player of the Month award. On 7 December, he was played as a forward after Vale suffered an injury crisis that left them short of recognized strikers, and scored two goals to secure a 2–1 win at Bristol Rovers. He was nominated for March's Player of the Month award after "driving Vale forward in the absence of captain Tom Conlon", scoring three goals and creating another. He started in the play-off final at Wembley Stadium as Vale secured promotion with a 3–0 victory over Mansfield Town; Michael Baggaley of The Sentinel wrote that "[Garrity] never stopped running, as has been the case all season... a huge threat in the attacking midfield role". At the club's end of season awards, Garrity was named as Fan's Player of the Year, Player's Player of the Year and Supporter’s Club Player of the Year.

Garrity was linked with a move to League One rivals Peterborough United in August 2022. He remained an ever-present for Vale in the first quarter of the 2022–23 season, playing in a deeper defensive role which restricted his opportunities to get forward and score goals. He maintained his consistence into February, providing an assist for Ellis Harrison to score the opening goal of a 2–1 defeat at Bolton Wanderers.

Style of play
Garrity is an attacking box-to-box midfielder with good energy and fitness levels. He has a strong aerial presence, scoring many of his goals from headers. He has stated that "I am not as good as other people so I know I need to work harder than them, and then over time I will get better".

Personal life
Garrity worked as an engineer for five years before becoming a professional footballer in 2020.

Career statistics

Honours
Individual
 Lower Breck F.C. Player of the Season: 2016–17
 Port Vale F.C. Player of the Year: 2022

Port Vale
EFL League Two play-offs: 2022

References

1997 births
Living people
Footballers from Liverpool
English footballers
Formby F.C. players
Lower Breck F.C. players
Warrington Town F.C. players
Blackpool F.C. players
Oldham Athletic A.F.C. players
Port Vale F.C. players
Association football midfielders
North West Counties Football League players
Northern Premier League players
English Football League players
English engineers